The Orphic Trilogy is a series of three French films written and directed by Jean Cocteau: 
 The Blood of a Poet, or Le sang d'un poète, 1930
 Orpheus, or Orphée (also the title used in the UK), 1950
 Testament of Orpheus, or Le testament d'Orphée, 1960

The Criterion Collection has released the trilogy as a DVD boxed set (which has since gone out-of-print).

References

French film series
Jean Cocteau
Trilogies